Notre Dame de la Baie Academy (known locally as Notre Dame or simply NDA) is a co-educational Roman Catholic high school in Green Bay, Wisconsin. The name is French for "Our Lady of the Bay". Located in the Roman Catholic Diocese of Green Bay, and co-sponsored with the Norbertine Order, Notre Dame has an enrollment of approximately 800 students.

History
The school was created by the consolidation of three former Catholic high schools: St. Joseph Academy, an all-girls school founded in 1896; Abbot Pennings High School, an all-boys school founded in 1898 as St. Norbert High School; and Our Lady of Premontre High School, an all-boys school founded in 1941 as Catholic Central High School. Premontre later became co-ed shortly before the three separate Catholic high schools merged.

Since its creation in 1990, the school has maintained a focus on an independent college preparatory curriculum. In April 2007, it received authorization from the International Baccalaureate Organization to include the IB Diploma Program in its curriculum.

Extracurriculars
In the 1990s, Notre Dame had a competitive show choir called Tritones. Today, NDA houses a number of clubs like Chinese Club, Chess Club, Gamer's Union, ASTRA, and STING Cancer.

Athletics 
Notre Dame's athletic teams are known as the Tritons, and compete in the Fox River Classic Conference of the Wisconsin Interscholastic Athletic Association as well as the WACPC. The school has won 41 team state championships, including 33 WIAA team state championships.

Notable people

Notable alumni

 Mason Appleton (2014), National Hockey League player (Winnipeg Jets)
 Eric Genrich (1998), Mayor of Green Bay
 Kevin Harlan (Premontre 1977), American sports commentator
 Allie LeClaire (2014), former professional basketball player and assistant women's basketball coach at Eastern Illinois University
 Max McCormick (2010), National Hockey League player (Seattle Kraken)
 John Rudzinski (2001), Air Force Academy, All-Mountain West Conference Linebacker
 John Schneider (Abbot Pennings 1989), National Football League General Manager (Seattle Seahawks)

Notable faculty 
 Mike Rader: former Wisconsin Badgers football player and current head coach of the NDA Football program.

References

External links
Official website

Roman Catholic Diocese of Green Bay
Catholic secondary schools in Wisconsin
Educational institutions established in 1990
International Baccalaureate schools in Wisconsin
High schools in Green Bay, Wisconsin
Premonstratensian Order
1990 establishments in Wisconsin